Karelin, or Karelina (Карелина; feminine), is a Russian last name and may refer to:

Alexander Karelin (b. 1967), Soviet/Russian wrestler and Hero of the Russian Federation
Anatoly Karelin (1922–1974), Soviet aircraft pilot and Hero of the Soviet Union
Andrei Karelin (1837–1906), Russian photographer
Apollon Karelin (1863–1926), Russian anarchist
Grigory Karelin (1801–1872), Russian explorer
Ivan Karelin (1924–2001), Soviet test pilot and Hero of the Soviet Union
Konstantin Karelin (1907–1994), Soviet army officer and Hero of the Soviet Union
Lazar Karelin (b. 1920), Soviet writer
Pavel Karelin (1990–2011), Russian ski jumper
Pyotr Karelin (1922–1944), Soviet army officer and Hero of the Soviet Union
Vasily Karelin (1862 or 1869 – 1926), Russian opera singer 
Vladimir Karelin (1891–1938), Russian/Soviet politician and one of the leaders of the Left Socialist-Revolutionaries

Surnames
Russian-language surnames